The field archery tournaments at the 2001 World Games in Akita was played between 17 and 19 August. 90 archers, from 18 nations, participated in the tournament. The archery competition took place at Opas Skiing Spot.

Participating nations

Medal table

Events

Men's events

Women's events

References

External links
 World Archery
 Archery on IWGA website
 Results

 
2001 World Games
World Games